The St. John's Jr. Caps are a Canadian Junior ice hockey club from St. John's, Newfoundland and Labrador.  They are members of the St. John's Junior Hockey League and are 2009 Don Johnson Cup Maritime Junior B champions.

History
The St. John's Jr. Caps were founded in 1993 when the St. John's Jr. 50's, a veteran club with a history in Junior A and winning the Don Johnson Cup, ceased operations.

In 2009, despite losing the league final to the Mount Pearl Jr. Blades, the Jr. Caps found themselves in the Veitch Memorial Trophy playoffs for the Newfoundland Junior B Championship as representatives.  After beating the Deer Lake Jr. Red Wings 8-2, tying Mount Pearl 3-3, and beating the Central West Junior Hockey League Champion Central Jr. Cataracts 5-3, the Jr. Caps found themselves in the Veitch final with the best record against the Jr. Cataracts.  The Jr. Caps won their second ever Veitch Memorial Trophy by a score of 7-4.  With this they were qualified for the 2009 Don Johnson Cup in Bay Roberts, Newfoundland and Labrador.  They started the tournament by defeating the host Conception Bay North Jr. Stars 6-4.  They then lost 6-3 to the Island Junior Hockey League's Sherwood Falcons.  They then lost to the Nova Scotia Junior Hockey League's Cumberland County Blues 7-4.  They closed out the round robin with an 8-1 shellacking of the Jr. Cataracts who were in the tournament by virtue of New Brunswick opting out.  With a 2-2-0 record, they finished third and drew Cumberland County in the semi-final.  The Jr. Caps won the game 3-2 in double overtime.  On April 19, the Jr. Caps played the Sherwood Falcons for the Don Johnson Cup.  The Jr. Caps won 3-2 to win their first ever Maritime Junior B Championship.

In 2010, the Jr. Caps won the SJJHL title and the Veitch Memorial Trophy.  They lost out in the semi-final of the Don Johnson Cup to the Cumberland County Blues, who would move on to win the entire tournament.

in 2013, the Jr. Caps had one of the most memorable seasons ever. With a Season record of 25-3-0 and taking the league with a 12-0 playoff record sweeping every team that came in their way

Season-by-season record

Don Johnson Cup
Eastern Canada Jr B Championships

External links
SJJHL Website

Ice hockey teams in Newfoundland and Labrador
Ice hockey clubs established in 1993
1993 establishments in Newfoundland and Labrador
Sport in St. John's, Newfoundland and Labrador